Debra J. Dickerson (born 1959) is an American author, editor, writer, and contributing writer and blogger for Mother Jones magazine. Dickerson has been most prolific as an essayist, writing on race relations and racial identity in the United States.

Early life
She dropped out of Florissant Valley Community College and the University of Missouri, soon after to serve in the United States Air Force from 1980 to 1992 as an intelligence officer. She earned a BA in Politics and Government from the University of Maryland, College Park. Dickerson attended St. Mary's University and completed her master's in International Relations while still in the military. Her Air Force career culminated in her appointment as Chief of Intelligence at Ankara Air Station.

In 1992 she worked for President Clinton's presidential campaign while awaiting entrance to Harvard Law School. She graduated from HLS in 1995. While attending Harvard, she said she "had no stomach for the law. I decided to study less (a whole lot less) and have some fun." She began writing a column for the Harvard Law Record, the school's newspaper. Ultimately she pursued a full-time career in writing.

Writing career
She credits the 1996 New Republic essay "Who Shot Johnny?" for jump-starting her career. It describes a drive-by shooting that left her nephew paralyzed, and the family's ambivalence and frustration in knowing the shooter was a fellow African American. Her work has since appeared in The Washington Post, The New York Times Magazine, Good Housekeeping, VIBE, Mother Jones, Slate, The Village Voice, Salon and many other publications. She was a fellow at New America Foundation from 1999 to 2002. After giving up her personal blog in September 2007, Dickerson announced she will become a blogger for Mother Jones magazine.

Dickerson has published two books, An American Story, a memoir, and The End of Blackness. She attracted some attention, as well as accusations of race baiting, in 2007 by declaring that because Democratic president Barack Obama is not a descendant of West Africans brought involuntarily to the United States as slaves, he is not "black."

References

External links
 Biography at DebraDickerson.com
 Who Shot Johnny? – Article by Dickerson
 Author interview at Random House
 
 Racist like me. – A Slate article by Dickerson
 Video (and audio) of interview/conversation with Debra Dickerson and Ross Douthat at Bloggingheads.tv
 Video of conversation between Dickerson and Michelle Goldberg on Bloggingheads.tv

1959 births
American essayists
Living people
African-American women writers
African-American writers
University of Maryland, College Park alumni
United States Air Force officers
Harvard Law School alumni
American women essayists
Women in the United States Air Force
African-American female military personnel
St. Mary's University, Texas alumni
21st-century African-American people
21st-century African-American women
20th-century African-American people
20th-century African-American women
African-American United States Air Force personnel